This is a list of Finnish politicians. See also: :Category:Finnish politicians.

13th century 
Earl Birger, (1210-1266)

15th century 
Sten Sture the elder, (1470-1497 and 1501-1503)

16th century 
Gustav Vasa, (1496-1560)
Mikael Agricola

17th century 
Per Brahe, (1602-1680)
Jaakko Ilkka

18th century 
Augustin Ehrensvärd

19th century 
Gustaf Mauritz Armfelt
Fredrik Cygnaeus
Lauri Kivekäs
Verner Lindberg
Agathon Meurman
Emil Nestor Setälä
Johan Vilhelm Snellman
Pehr Evind Svinhufvud
Zacharias Topelius
Yrjö Sakari Yrjö-Koskinen

20th century 
Esko Aho
Martti Ahtisaari
Teuvo Aura
Aimo Cajander
Kaarlo Castrén
Urho Castren
Rafael Erich
Karl-August Fagerholm
Rainer von Fieandt
Mikhail Fyodorovich Ganskau
Antti Hackzell
Viktor Hedlund
Harri Holkeri
Lauri Ingman
Kaarlo Juho Ståhlberg
Kyösti Kallio
Ahti Karjalainen
Urho Kekkonen
Otto Ville Kuusinen
Toivo Mikael Kivimäki
Mauno Koivisto
Reino Kuuskoski
Reino Ragnar Lehto
Keijo Liinamaa
Edwin Linkomies
Paavo Lipponen
Carl Gustaf Emil Mannerheim
Oskari Mantere
Martti Miettunen
Juho Kusti Paasikivi
Rafael Paasio
Mauno Pekkala
Johan Wilhelm Rangell
Lauri Kristian Relander
Risto Ryti
Eugen Schauman
Kalevi Sorsa
Jussi Sukselainen
Juho Sunila
Pehr Evind Svinhufvud
Väinö Tanner
Oskari Tokoi
Ralf Törngren
Antti Tulenheimo
Sakari Tuomioja
Juho Vennola
Johannes Virolainen
Paavo Väyrynen

21st century 
Claes Andersson
Li Andersson
Paavo Arhinmäki
Pekka Haavisto
Jussi Halla-aho
Tony Halme
Tarja Halonen
Heidi Hautala
Eero Heinäluoma
Laura Huhtasaari
Ville Itälä
Anneli Jäätteenmäki
Tanja Karpela
Jyrki Katainen
Mari Kiviniemi
Martti Korhonen
Merja Kyllönen
Paavo Lipponen
Sanna Marin
Silvia Modig
Sauli Niinistö
Mauri Pekkarinen
Aino-Kaisa Pekonen
Kari Rajamäki
Paula Risikko
Jussi Saramo
Suvi-Anne Siimes
Timo Soini
Osmo Soininvaara
Alexander Stubb
Marja Tiura
Erkki Tuomioja
Jutta Urpilainen
Matti Vanhanen
Jan Vapaavuori
Paavo Väyrynen

See also 

President of Finland
Prime Minister of Finland
Provincial Governors of Finland
List of Finnish rulers
Governor-General of Finland
List of Finns
Politics of Finland
Government of Finland
Parliament of Finland

Finnish politicians
Finnish politicians